The College of Education & Health Professions is the University of Arkansas's college for students with interest in the education and health professions. The college has five departments, and an honors program through the Honors College. In 2015, Fulbright College awarded the second-most undergraduate degrees of the eight colleges at the University of Arkansas.

Departments
 Curriculum and Instruction
 Education Reform
 Eleanor Mann School of Nursing
 Health, Human Performance and Recreation
 Rehabilitation, Human Resources and Communication Disorders
 The College of Education and Health Professions' Honors Program

Mann School of Nursing
Two degrees are offered by the School of Nursing, the Bachelor of Science in Nursing, and a cohort-based Master of Science in Nursing Online Clinical Program, which will take a full-time student 2½ years to complete.

Facilities
A gallery shows the facilities of the college, with years used in parentheses.

References

Health sciences schools in the United States
Schools of education in Arkansas
University of Arkansas